Johor Darul Ta'zim Football Club II or simply JDT II is a Malaysia football club based in Johor Bahru, Johor. The club currently plays in the Malaysia Premier League, the second division professional football league in Malaysia. Johor Darul Ta'zim II is a feeder club for Johor Darul Ta'zim.

History
Johor Darul Ta'zim II was founded as Johor Football Association (then known as Johor FA or simply Johor) in 1955 and are known as one of the "second-wave" football teams to participate in Malaysian football league (first-wave are Kedah and Selangor.). In its early years, the team was based in Kluang, Johor under the guidance of its Johor Football Association. In 1964, the southern-side team moved to Tan Sri Dato' Haji Hassan Yunos Stadium. Few changes in the management of Johor Football Association in the 1970s saw Datuk Suleiman Mohd Noor appointed as president and team manager. Under his management, the team rose as a formidable team in the football scene. This was proven some years later when Johor won Piala Razak trophy in 1983 and their first ever Malaysia Cup trophy in 1985 and also Piala Sultan Haji Ahmad Shah (better known as Piala Sumbangsih) in 1986 under then coach, Ahmad Esa.

When the Malaysia football league went Semi-Pro in 1989, Johor was the first team to win the Malaysia Cup and the Malaysia League in 1991, thus achieved a "Grand Double", first ever by a team in this country during that Semi-Pro period. It was also a second Malaysia Cup for the Johor team. In 1992, Johor finished seventh in the league, their worst standings since 1989. This was proven crucial for the former coach, Michael Urukalo, as he was dismissed and replaced by Wan Jamak Wan Hassan. Johor see off their 1993 season well, standing at fifth position even without two of their cup-winners import players, Abbas Saad and Alistair Edwards. The team then went on with years of trophyless drought until 1998, when they won their first FA Cup. The next season saw the team clinching promotion to top division in winning the Liga Premier title. Johor had a tough seasons in the Premier One League and finally were relegated back to Premier Two League in 2001 after two years in top-flight division.

For the 2006–07 Liga Premier competition, Johor FA decided to compete under the sponsored name Johor PBT Pasir Gudang (or Johor Pasir Gudang). They were given the green light by Football Association of Malaysia on 9 January 2007 to compete under the new name. Reasons behind the change for the team's name are controversial because the team had to merged with now-defunct Pasir Gudang United F.C. which caused an unrest amongst supporters. However, there are another reason because the Pasir Gudang Local Authority (PBTPG), now known as Majlis Perbandaran Pasir Gudang (MPPG), is Johor FA's main sponsor during that season.

Under rebranding exercise done under ownership of Tunku Ismail Ibrahim of all Johor football in 2014, Johor FA football team is rebranded to Johor Darul Ta'zim FC II and is now operating as the second team of Johor Darul Ta'zim FC (JDT). Acting as reserve team to JDT, both teams now are permitted to transfer several players between them in a season, without the restriction of registration windows. Under this agreement, a player contracted to JDT may make several appearances with JDT II, and vice versa.

Club's names
 1955–2006    : Johor Football Association (Johor FA)
 2006–2007    : Johor Pihak Berkuasa Tempatan Pasir Gudang (Johor PBT Pasir Gudang)
 2007–2013    : Johor Football Association (Johor FA)
 2014–present : Johor Darul Ta'zim Football Club II (Johor Darul Ta'zim F.C. II)

Stadium

Pasir Gudang Corporation Stadium

Prior 2020, Johor Darul Ta'zim II FC played their home games at Pasir Gudang Corporation Stadium (Malay: Stadium Perbadanan Pasir Gudang). It is a multi-use stadium in Pasir Gudang, Johor Bahru District, Johor, Malaysia. It has both an indoor stadium and an outdoor stadium within its compound.

The outdoor stadium can hold a maximum of 15,000 people and is currently used mostly for football matches, serving as the home stadium to Johor Darul Ta'zim II in the Liga Premier.

Tan Sri Dato' Haji Hassan Yunos Stadium

Starting from 2020 season onward, Johor Darul Ta'zim II FC will play their home games at Tan Sri Dato' Haji Hassan Yunos Stadium after their main team, Johor Darul Ta'zim FC move to Sultan Ibrahim Stadium.

Stadium and locations

Achievements

Honours

Domestic

League
Malaysia Super League / Division 1
 Winners (1): 1991
 Runners-up (1): 1985
Malaysia Premier League / Division 2
 Winners (2): 1999, 2022
Runners-up (1): 2019
 Malaysia FAM League / Division 3
 Runners-up (3): 1959, 1966, 1973

Cups

Malaysia Cup
 Winners (2): 1985, 1991
 Runners-up (1): 1986

Malaysia Challenge Cup
 Winners (1): 2019
Malaysian FA Cup
 Winners (1): 1998

Malaysia Charity Shield
 Winners (1): 1986
 Runners-up (2): 1992, 1999

Crown Prince of Johor Cup
 Winners (1): 2012

International
  Sultan Hassanal Bolkiah Cup
 Winners: 1987

Players

Current squad

Out on loan

Coaching staff

Managerial history
Head coaches by years (2014–present)

References

External links
  (in English)

Reserves
Malaysia Premier League clubs
Football clubs in Malaysia
Malaysia Cup winners
Malaysian reserve football teams